Pavones is a station on Line 9 of the Madrid Metro. It is located in fare Zone A.

References 

Line 9 (Madrid Metro) stations
Buildings and structures in Moratalaz District, Madrid
Railway stations in Spain opened in 1980